Víctor Fernández (born 1960) is a Spanish football coach. 

Víctor Fernández may also refer to:

 Vic Fernandez (1939–2020), Argentine footballer and manager
 Víctor Fernández (footballer, born 1987), Spanish footballer
 Víctor Fernández (equestrian), Argentine Olympic equestrian
 Víctor Manuel Fernández (born 1962), Argentine bishop and theologian
 Victor Fernández (footballer, born 1998), Spanish footballer